The  Faculty of Business  (FB) at The Hong Kong Polytechnic University (PolyU) was established in 2002. It provides undergraduate and postgraduate programmes in Hong Kong and mainland China. Currently, FB consists of three schools/departments: School of Accounting and Finance, Department of Logistics and Maritime Studies and Department of Management and Marketing.

Reputation
 17th in the world according to the Worldwide Business Research Rankings compiled by Korea University Business School (KUBS).

Programmes in Hong Kong
Offered by the Faculty of Business
Doctor of Philosophy (Ph.D.) 
Doctor of Business Administration (DBA)
Doctor of FinTech (DFinTech)
Master of Business Administration (MBA)
Master of Science (MSc) in Business Management
Master of Science (MSc) in China Business Studies
Broad Discipline of Business (Undergraduate Programme)

Offered by School of Accounting and Finance
Master of Corporate Governance
Master of Finance – Financial Economics in Energy and Environment 
Master of Finance – Investment Management
Master of Finance – Corporate Finance 
Master of / Postgraduate Diploma (PgD) in Professional Accounting 
Master of Science (MSc) in Accountancy 
Bachelor of Business Administration (Honours) in Accountancy
Bachelor of Business Administration (Honours) in Accounting and Finance
Bachelor of Business Administration (Honours) in Financial Services

Offered by Department of Logistics and Maritime Studies
Master of Science (MSc) / Postgraduate Diploma (PgD) in Global Supply Chain Management
Master of Science (MSc) / Postgraduate Diploma (PgD) in International Shipping and Transport Logistics
Master of Science (MSc) in Management (Operations Management)
Master of Science (MSc) in Quality Management
Bachelor of Business Administration (Honours) in International Shipping and Transport Logistics
Bachelor of Business Administration (Honours) in Global Supply Chain Management
Bachelor of Business Administration (Honours) in Aviation Management and Logistics

Offered by Department of Management and Marketing
Master of Science (MSc) in Human Resource Management
Master of Science (MSc) in Marketing Management
Master of Science (MSc) in Business Analytics
Bachelor of Business Administration (Honours) in Management
Bachelor of Business Administration (Honours) in Marketing

Programmes in Mainland China
Doctor of Management (Cooperate with Renmin University of China)
Master of Business Administration (MBA) (Cooperate with Xian Jiaotong University)
Master of Science (MSc) in Quality Management (Cooperate with Zhejiang University)

Research Centres
Asian Centre for Branding and Marketing (ACBM)
Center for Economic Sustainability and Entrepreneurial Finance (CESEF)
Centre for Leadership & Innovation (CLI)
C Y Tung International Centre for Maritime Studies (ICMS)
IMC-Frank Tsao Maritime Library and Research & Development Centre (IMCC)
Laboratory of Container Security (LCS)
Logistics Research Centre (LRC)
Shipping Research Centre (SRC)
Sustainability Management Research Centre (SMRC)

Notable alumni
Xu Qin, Governor of Hebei
Wang Jianzhou, former chairman of China Mobile
Chang Xiaobing, former chairman of China Telecom
Annie Au, a professional squash player who represents Hong Kong

References

Hong Kong Polytechnic University
Business schools in Hong Kong
Educational institutions established in 2002
2002 establishments in Hong Kong